Interstate 39 (I-39) is a highway in the Midwestern United States. I-39 was designed to replace U.S. Route 51 (US 51), which, in the early 1980s, was one of the busiest two-lane highways in the United States. I-39 was built in the 1980s and 1990s.

With the exception of an  segment around Portage, Wisconsin, the Interstate shares a route with at least one other route number in I-39's entirety. From Rockford, Illinois, to Portage, Wisconsin, I-39 runs concurrently with I-90. In Wisconsin, I-94 joins the pair in Madison until Portage. At  in length, this concurrency of three Interstates is the longest in the country. From Portage northward, US 51 is cosigned with the Interstate and has exit numbers based on its mileage.

Route description

Illinois 

In Illinois, I-39 begins at I-55, north of Bloomington–Normal, Illinois. From the city, I-39 runs north largely through rural areas, intersecting Illinois Route 251 (IL 251) at exit 8. Just north of the Illinois River, I-39 runs east of the cities of LaSalle and Peru before intersecting I-80 at exit 59. North of I-80, the wind turbines of the Mendota Hills Wind Farm can be seen from milepost 72 at Mendota north to near Paw Paw. I-39 intersects I-88 at exit 97 in Rochelle. Further north, I-39 crosses the Kishwaukee River before meeting US 20 on the southside of Rockford. I-39 then runs east concurrently with US 20 to where the Interstate joins the Jane Addams Memorial Tollway and I-90 near Cherry Valley. While concurrent, I-39/I-90 follows I-90's exit numbering. I-39/I-90 heads north to South Beloit. There is a toll plaza just south of Rockton Road. US 51 leaves I-39/I-90 at IL 75 at exit 1 in South Beloit, while I-39/I-90 continues north into Wisconsin.

For all but  that I-39 is in Illinois, it is designated concurrently with US 51.

Wisconsin 
I-39 enters from Illinois along with I-90, passing under County Trunk Highway P (CTH-P, Stateline Road), and bypasses Beloit to the east. East of the town, the route has an interchange at exit 185 that serves as the terminus for both WIS 81, which heads westward into Beloit, and I-43, which provides access to Milwaukee. The last interchange serving Beloit is CTH-S (Shopiere Road) at exit 183. WIS 11 leaves I-39/I-90 at exit 175, heading east. The highway bypasses Janesville to the east, although interchanges with US 14 and WIS 26 (Milton Avenue) provide access to the town. The highway continues generally to the north, crossing the Rock River before an interchange with WIS 59 that provides access to Edgerton to the west and Milton to the southeast. Subsequently, the highway enters Dane County as it passes west of Lake Koshkonong. It is joined at exit 160 by US 51 from Edgerton and serves as the southern terminus of WIS 73. US 51 leaves the route  to the north and heads west through Stoughton. The Interstate gradually turns westward around Utica to an interchange with CTH-N, providing access to Stoughton and Cottage Grove. It then turns gradually back to the north and meets US 12 and US 18 in Madison. I-39/I-90 bypasses Madison to the east, and I-94 joins the concurrency at the eastern terminus of WIS 30, an interchange known as the Badger Interchange. About  to the north, the highway crosses US 151, which includes a south side access to High Crossing Boulevard. Access is provided to CTH-V (West North Street) via exit 126 just west of DeForest  further north.

At  further along the route from the river, I-39 leaves the concurrency with I-90/I-94 at exit 108 and turns northward while the other two Interstates turn northwesterly. WIS 78 terminates at this interchange and heads southwest. This is the starting point of the segment of freeway that carries the I-39 route alone. After crossing the Wisconsin River again, I-39 crosses the second interchange—this one with WIS 16—and turns northeasterly to an interchange with US 51. The U.S. Highway joins the Interstate, and both turn north once again and leave the Portage area and, after , enter Marquette County.

WIS 23 joins I-39/US 51 northbound,  from the county line. The highway passes along Buffalo Lake and encounter a southside half interchange with CTH-D in the town of Packwaukee. WIS 23 leaves the concurrency to the east heading toward Montello at WIS 82 near Oxford, and the freeway takes a due north route to pass Westfield. I-39/US 51 meets an interchange in Hancock with CTH-V  further north, and WIS 73 crosses in Plainfield after another . In Portage County, I-39/US 51 take a due north trajectory, which provides access to CTH-D, CTH-W, and WIS 54 (also Business U.S. Highway 51 (Bus. The next four interchanges—CTH-HH, US 10 eastbound/WIS 66 westbound, Stanley Street, and Bus. US 51—provide access to Stevens Point. Among these interchanges, the freeway turns northwestward, bypassing the city to the east and north.

WIS 153 crosses the freeway  further north in Mosinee. Maple Ridge Road crosses after another  as the freeway turns northeastward into Kronenwetter. An interchange with Bus. US 51 is just south of the Wisconsin River crossing after  from Maple Ridge Road. I-39 ends  further north at the interchange with WIS 29 east just southwest of Wausau. US 51 continues north on the freeway after WIS 29 toward Merrill.

History

Illinois 
When the Interstate Highway System was first being planned, Illinois made a request for a north–south highway from South Beloit to Salem. The project was deemed a low priority and was shelved. US 51, which ran mostly down the middle of the state, became a heavily traveled two-lane arterial road, experiencing many crashes and earning the nickname "Killer 51".

In the late 1960s and early 1970s, a major supplemental freeway system plan was proposed, with the goal of providing Illinois residents access to freeways within 30 minutes or less. One of the proposed routes, FAP 412, was a route that would extend from US 20 in Rockford to I-57 just north of Salem, similar to the earlier requested route. Due to traffic counts, only the portion between Rockford and Decatur was prioritized.

Over the course of the 1970s, planning for the US 51 supplemental freeway took place in earnest. However, debate ensued over what type of highway should be built. The Illinois Department of Transportation (IDOT) wanted the entire highway built to Interstate Highway standards, but a transportation committee established to review the proposed supplemental freeway system recommended only Interstate construction between Rockford and I-80. The highway from Oglesby south to Decatur was recommended to be an at-grade expressway, utilizing the existing road where possible. After a decade of lobbying by interest groups, it was announced in 1986 that US 51 would be rebuilt to Interstate standards from Oglesby to Normal. However, due to funding concerns and local opposition, it was decided that the Bloomington to Decatur segment would not be built to Interstate standards; this segment was made a four lane expressway.

The first segment of the freeway opened 1984 from IL 5 (now I-88) in Rochelle, to US 20 in Rockford. When the freeway was completed south from IL 5 to I-80 in 1986, IDOT officially requested an Interstate designation for the new highway, and I-39 was officially designated. By December 1987, construction on the section of I-39 between I-80 and IL 251 was finished. The next section, between IL 251 and I-55 in Bloomington–Normal, was completed by 1992, although this stretch of the highway was opened in several phases as completed. In early September 1992, another segment opened from IL 116 north to IL 17.

Wisconsin 
In Wisconsin, the highway was officially designated in 1992. In October 1993, AASHTO established part of I-39 in its northern section between Rockford and Rib Mountain, Wisconsin, then designated I-39 along existing portions of I-90, I-94, and US 51. However, this part of the highway was not marked as I-39 for another four years, primarily because the Wisconsin Department of Transportation (WisDOT) had to reconstruct the interchange connecting I-90 and I-94 with WIS 78 near Portage. Signs denoting I-39 were placed along the highway in Wisconsin until 1996, when the section between Portage and Rib Mountain (near Wausau) received its signs. This occurred after then–Governor Tommy Thompson designated the stretch between Portage and Wausau in 1996 after a five-year push to get the Interstate designation approved. The remaining segment along I-90/I-94 was not signed for I-39 until late 1998 The section between the I-90/I-94 interchange and US 51's interchange in Portage was previously a part of WIS 78. That route was truncated back to its current terminus when the Interstate's designation went into effect. The designation of I-39 violated Wisconsin's rule of not having any state trunk highway number duplicated—Interstate, US, or state—as WIS 39 already existed.

Exit list

See also

References

External links 

Illinois Highway Ends: Interstate 39

 
U.S. Route 51
39
39
39
Transportation in McLean County, Illinois
Transportation in Woodford County, Illinois
Transportation in Marshall County, Illinois
Transportation in LaSalle County, Illinois
Transportation in Lee County, Illinois
Transportation in Ogle County, Illinois
Transportation in Winnebago County, Illinois
Transportation in Rock County, Wisconsin
Transportation in Dane County, Wisconsin
Transportation in Columbia County, Wisconsin
Transportation in Marquette County, Wisconsin
Transportation in Waushara County, Wisconsin
Transportation in Portage County, Wisconsin
Transportation in Marathon County, Wisconsin